NDOC (and variants) may refer to:

 Nevada Department of Corrections
 Kenya National Disaster Operation Centre
 NDoc, code documentation generator for the .NET Common Language Infrastructure
 Ndoc, Albanian given name